Rufino Segovia del Burgo (born 1 March 1985), known simply as Rufino, is a Spanish footballer who plays for Marbella FC as a forward.

Club career
Born in Madrid, Rufino made his professional debut with hometown's Rayo Vallecano, first appearing with the first team in the 2004–05 season as they competed in the Segunda División B. He then moved to neighbours Atlético Madrid, where he would spend the vast majority of his spell with the reserves.

Rufino's La Liga output would consist of two matches: on 22 April 2006, he replaced fellow youth graduate Manu del Moral for the final 20 minutes of a 1–0 win at Deportivo Alavés. Almost one year later, he played roughly the same amount of time in a 0–0 home draw against Real Betis.

Released in summer 2007, Rufino took his game to division three, consecutively with Real Valladolid Promesas, Águilas CF, UD Melilla and CD Toledo. In July 2011, after one year in Hungary, he returned to his country and signed for Burgos CF of the same tier.

Rufino spent the vast majority of the following seasons in the third division, also helping the club he represented mostly in this timeframe, CD Toledo, promote from the fourth in 2013. In 2015 he returned to top-flight football, sharing teams with four compatriots at ACS Poli Timișoara in the Romanian Liga I.

While playing for Selangor F.C. in the Malaysia Super League, Rufino was crowned top scorer of the 2018 season with 19 goals, adding the Best Foreign Player award. Just five matches into the following campaign, he injured his Achilles tendon and was sidelined for nine months; during this period, he also lost his father (named Rufino as well).

Rufino returned to Spain on 24 September 2021, with the 36-year-old signing with Tercera División RFEF club Marbella FC.

Career statistics

References

External links

1985 births
Living people
Spanish footballers
Footballers from Madrid
Association football forwards
La Liga players
Segunda División B players
Tercera División players
Tercera Federación players
Rayo Vallecano B players
Rayo Vallecano players
Atlético Madrid B players
Atlético Madrid footballers
Real Valladolid Promesas players
Águilas CF players
UD Melilla footballers
CD Toledo players
Burgos CF footballers
Huracán Valencia CF players
Marbella FC players
Nemzeti Bajnokság I players
Budapest Honvéd FC players
Liga I players
ACS Poli Timișoara players
Hong Kong First Division League players
Kitchee SC players
Malaysia Super League players
Selangor FA players
Spanish expatriate footballers
Expatriate footballers in Hungary
Expatriate footballers in Romania
Expatriate footballers in Hong Kong
Expatriate footballers in Malaysia
Spanish expatriate sportspeople in Hungary
Spanish expatriate sportspeople in Romania
Spanish expatriate sportspeople in Hong Kong
Spanish expatriate sportspeople in Malaysia